Good Hope is an unincorporated community in Marion County, Mississippi, United States.

References

Unincorporated communities in Marion County, Mississippi
Unincorporated communities in Mississippi